The Bayernhymne (Hymn of Bavaria) is the official anthem of the Free State of Bavaria.

History

The melody of the song was written by Max Kunz in 1835. The text for the original first three stanzas was written by Michael Öchsner. Both men were members of the Bürger-Sänger-Zunft München (Citizen-Singers-Guild Munich), that first performed the song on December 15, 1860.

In 1946, the poet Joseph Maria Lutz wrote a new third stanza as a replacement for the Königsstrophe (King’s Stanza), since after the abdication of King Ludwig III in 1918, Bavaria has been without a king. He also replaced the Deutsche Erde (German soil) in the first stanza with Heimaterde (native soil).

In 1946, it was also officially recognised as the national anthem of Bavaria, and on July 29, 1966, the then prime minister of Bavaria, Alfons Goppel, chose the version written by Joseph Maria Lutz to be the official version.

In 1980, the Bavarian minister-president Franz Josef Strauß changed the official version to contain just the first two stanzas and switched Heimaterde back to Deutsche Erde, though the Heimaterde version is still widely used (for example, it was sung during the visit of Pope Benedict XVI to his native Bavaria in 2006, who also joined in singing this version).

The song, like most national anthems, contains many symbolic representations, including repeated allusions to the colours white and blue, Bavaria’s national colours, especially describing Bavaria's Himmel, which can refer to both sky and heaven. The march Bayerischer Defiliermarsch is often played along the hymn.

Current Version
(According to the bulletin of the Bavarian prime minister on July 18, 1980.)

Variations

Version by Joseph Maria Lutz from 1946

Michael Öchsner’s 1860 Poem

Later Text from Michael Öchsner

References

External links
Official site of the Bavarian Parliament (in German)
Official site of the Bavarian Government (in German, includes audio)

German anthems
Regional songs
Culture of Bavaria
German patriotic songs
Songs about Germany
National anthem compositions in A major